Walker's Rhyming Dictionary was made by John Walker and released in 1775. It is an English reverse dictionary, meaning that it is sorted by reading words in reverse order. As spelling somewhat predicts pronunciation, this functions as a rhyming dictionary.

Laurence H. Dawson, in his Preface to the ‘Revised and Enlarged edition’ of Walker’s dictionary in the first half of the twentieth century, notes that: "Though it was never in the true sense a dictionary of rhymes, has been for over one hundred and fifty years a standard work of reference and has been a friend in need for generations of poets and rhymesters from Byron downwards." Indeed, John Walker apologised for the book’s title, stating that the main purpose of his dictionary was to "facilitate the orthography and pronunciation of the English language". Dawson rejects the possibility of it being used for this purpose, claiming that it will instead be useful to "contributors to the 'Poets' Corner' or writer of humorous verse", "the phonetician", "the enthusiast for some new system of Simplified Spelling", and solvers of "Acrostics".

Walker's original 1775 edition of the dictionary contained 34000 words, and Dawson's expanded twentieth-century edition added approximately 20000 more words to the volume. Michael Freeman's 1983 supplement enlarged the dictionary further, choosing to include slang and an increased numbers of words without Anglophone origins, for example, in the first 10 entries in his supplement include Arabic, Brazilian, Egyptian, Tatar and African words (p. 551). Proper nouns are not, by and large, covered by the dictionary, although some exceptions are made "for a number the pronunciation of which are not self-evident". It also has some Scots words, including callant, hogmanay, wrongous, een, tolbooth, and wis/wist (although it is not a regular word)..

References

English dictionaries
Rhyme